Gaylord Judd Clarke (February 25, 1836 in Owego, Tioga County, New York – December 7, 1870 in El Paso, Texas) was an American newspaper editor, lawyer, poet and politician from New York and Texas.

Life
He graduated from Union College in 1859. He married Frances H. Corey (daughter of Hon. Allen Corey, of Troy, New York). He edited the Lockport Advertiser from 1860 to 1863.

In 1862, he was elected on the Democratic ticket an Inspector of State Prisons, being in office from 1863 to 1865. Afterwards he removed to Plattsmouth, Nebraska.

He studied law, and was admitted to the bar on July 19, 1869. In July, 1870, Governor Edmund J. Davis appointed him, as a Republican, Judge of the 25th Judicial District of Texas. In October 1870, Clarke became a co-founder of the first Protestant church in El Paso, the Church of St. Clement (so named in memory his deceased son). The senior Clarke was shot dead in the street by lawyer Benjamin F. Williams after a gunfight between Williams and Albert Jennings Fountain in Ben Dowell's Saloon in El Paso.

References

Sources
The New York Civil List compiled by Franklin Benjamin Hough, Stephen C. Hutchins and Edgar Albert Werner (1867; pages 411 and 507)
QUERIES AND ANSWERS in NYT on March 13, 1919
Encyclopedia of Western Gunfighters by Bill O'Neal (republished by University of Oklahoma Press, 1991,  ; page 112)
 His widow's second marriage, at RootsWeb

1836 births
1870 deaths
Politicians from Lockport, New York
People from Plattsmouth, Nebraska
New York State Prison Inspectors
19th-century American newspaper editors
People from El Paso, Texas
People from Owego, New York
People murdered in Texas
Male murder victims
Union College (New York) alumni
Deaths by firearm in Texas
Murdered American journalists
American male journalists
New York (state) Democrats
Texas Republicans
19th-century male writers
Journalists from New York (state)
Journalists from Texas